Inger Louise Valle (28 November 1921 – 21 May 2006) was a Norwegian politician for the Labour Party, particularly noted for her efforts to reform the Norwegian penal system. She is the mother of professor Jan Grund.

Biography
She represented Akershus in the Norwegian Parliament in the period between 1977-1981. She also served as Minister of Administration and Consumer Affairs 1971-1972 and Minister of Family and Consumer Affairs in 1972, Minister of Justice and the Police 1973-1976 and 1976–1979, and Minister of Local Government Affairs 1979-1980. Valle also served in the local government of Bærum, and was Norway's first Consumer Ombudsman.

Born into a privileged family and educated as an attorney, Valle was one of the first ministers of justice whose main career had been in politics. Her views on the Norwegian penal system were grounded in humanistic principles founded in criminology, and several of her proposals for reform met with controversy. In particular the so-called "Criminal report" in 1978 (Stortingsmelding 104, 1977-1978) caused considerable controversy. The report asserted that the deterrent effect of stiff penalties was a myth, and that policy toward criminals should be based in broader considerations than penology. It didn't help matters much that she enlisted Arne Haugestad, who had already gained notoriety in the campaign against Norwegian membership in the European Community, as the director of Norway's penal system. Among other things, he recommended eliminating prison sentences as punishment for crimes for financial gain.

The controversy gained steam in the fall of 1978, when professor of law Johs Andenæs critiqued the report in a meeting arranged by the Conservative Party, claiming that the principles were coddling criminals and threatening law and order. The year after in April 1979, Valle pressured prime minister Nordli to push through Stortinget, against all advice and recommendations the total abolition of the death penalty in Norway. Valle quickly found herself isolated, even now within her own party. Much of the blame for the Labour Party's relatively poor showing in the 1979 elections were put at her feet.

Even among her detractors, she is noted for her moral courage and commitment to humanistic values. Although many of her proposed reforms never were implemented, some were, notably raising  the age of criminal accountability and including community service in the penal system.

Valle headed the Norwegian executive committee for UN's International Women's Year in 1975.

References

Government ministers of Norway
Ministers of Children, Equality and Social Inclusion of Norway
Ministers of Local Government and Modernisation of Norway
Labour Party (Norway) politicians
Members of the Storting
Bærum politicians
Norwegian criminologists
Norwegian jurists
Women jurists
Ombudsmen in Norway
Directors of government agencies of Norway
1921 births
2006 deaths
Women members of the Storting
Place of birth missing
Place of death missing
20th-century Norwegian women politicians
20th-century Norwegian politicians
Women government ministers of Norway
Norwegian women criminologists
Female justice ministers
Ministers of Justice of Norway